The A46 autoroute is a  highway in central France.  It connects the town of Givors to Anse and eastern Lyon. It was completed in 1992.

Characteristics 
 2x2 lanes (2X3 lanes at Rillieux-la-Pape)
 65 km long
 A radar speed trap has been installed at Rillieux-la-Pape (southbound). Speed limit 90 km/h.

History 
 1992 : Opening of the A46 and the RN346.
 2007 : Opening of the third lane between Genay and the Mionnay Service Area.

Since 2002, there have been further attempts to prohibit heavy traffic over 7.5 tons in Lyon and divert them onto this motorway-by-pass.  This is controversial because it generates extra journey times distances travelled.

Junctions

External links

A46 autoroute in Saratlas

Autoroutes in France
Ring roads in France